Joe Hanson (born October 8, 2003) is a Canadian soccer player who currently plays for Whitecaps FC 2 of MLS Next Pro. Hanson is notably the first player to ever sign and play soccer professionally from the Yukon.

Career

Club
Hanson played youth soccer for clubs in Whitehorse, Seattle, and Vancouver before joining the Vancouver Whitecaps FC Academy in 2019. In March 2022 he signed with Whitecaps FC 2. Hanson made his professional debut on March 26 against Houston Dynamo 2.

International
Hanson is eligible for both Canada and the United States.

References

Living people
2003 births
Canadian soccer players
Association football forwards
Whitecaps FC 2 players
Sportspeople from Whitehorse
MLS Next Pro players